is a Japanese animation studio. It was founded by ex-Frontline animation producer Hayato Kaneko in December 2007 and is based in Tokyo.

History
After the company's establishment in 2007, Shin Oonuma, who was previously a director alongside Shaft directors Akiyuki Shinbo and Tatsuya Oishi, joined the studio. A majority of Silver Link's productions have involved Oonuma as a director or co-director since his joining of the studio. The company had also owned two subsidiaries: Beep Co., Ltd., a subcontracting animation studio, and Connect, Inc., a studio that started off co-producing series with Silver Link, and has since expanded into producing its own works. Both subsidiaries have since been dissolved by the studio, though they both still continue to operate as divisions within the company.

On February 1, 2016, Beep was absorbed into Silver Link, and was succeeded by Silver Link Overseas Division, taking over Beep's former office space. However, the Beep brand still remains in use for sub-contracting work by the studio.
 
On July 17, 2020, it was announced that Silver Link would be wholly absorbing and dissolving Connect, and that all rights managed by the company would be transferred to Silver Link. However, Connect will still continue to operate as a sub-studio within Silver Link.

On August 3, 2020, it was announced that Asahi Broadcasting Group Holdings had acquired Silver Link for 250 million yen.

On October 1, 2020, the company changed its name to Silver Link Asset Management Co., Ltd. and split off its animation production business into a new company named Silver Link, Inc.

Works

Television series

OVA/ONAs

Films

See also

 Shaft—Silver Link director Shin Oonuma was a former director with Shaft, and serves in a similar capacity to longtime colleague Akiyuki Shinbo's role at Shaft with Silver Link.

Notes

References

External links
 

 
Animation studios in Tokyo
Japanese companies established in 2007
Japanese animation studios
Mass media companies established in 2007
2020 mergers and acquisitions